Benjamin Blufford Sturgeon (August 24, 1856 – January 21, 1931) was a Texas legislator that served in the Texas Senate for district 3, which at the time was composed of Lamar County and Fannin County.

Personal life
Sturgeon was born on August 24, 1856 and died on January 21, 1931.

Political career
He served on term in the Texas Senate for district 3, composed Lamar and Fannin County. He was a Democrat.

External links
 Benjamin Blufford Sturgeon (1860-1931) - Find A...

References

1856 births
1931 deaths
Democratic Party Texas state senators